Gloria Siebert ( Kovarik, born 13 January 1964 in Ortrand, Bezirk Cottbus) is a former East German hurdler.

She won the silver medal in the 100 metres hurdles at the 1988 Summer Olympics in Seoul. She also won silver medals at the 1981 European Junior Championships, the 1987 European Indoor Championships, the 1987 World Championships and the 1990 European Championships. Her result at the 1987 World Championships was 12.44 seconds, a career best time. This ranks her second among German 100 m hurdlers, only behind Bettine Jahn.

She competed for the sports club SC Cottbus during her active career, and became East German champion in 1987 and 1990 (100 metres hurdles) and 1984 (400 metres hurdles).

Her son Sebastian Siebert is also a hurdler.

Achievements

References

1964 births
Living people
People from Ortrand
People from Bezirk Cottbus
German female hurdlers
East German female hurdlers
Sportspeople from Brandenburg
Olympic athletes of East Germany
Athletes (track and field) at the 1988 Summer Olympics
World Athletics Championships athletes for East Germany
World Athletics Championships athletes for Germany
Olympic silver medalists for East Germany
Medalists at the 1988 Summer Olympics
World Athletics Championships medalists
European Athletics Championships medalists
Olympic silver medalists in athletics (track and field)
Recipients of the Patriotic Order of Merit in silver